The Eurotiales are an order of sac fungi, also known as the green and blue molds. It was circumscribed in 1980.

Classification

Currently the order Eurotiales contains 5 families, 28 genera and 1280 species:
Family Aspergillaceae  [=Monascaceae ]
Aspergillago  – 1 species
Aspergillus  – 428 species
Dichlaena  – 4 species
Hamigera  – 9 species
Leiothecium  – 2 species
Monascus  – 38 species
Penicilliopsis  – 15 species
Penicillium  – 467 species
Phialomyces  – 5 species
Pseudohamigera  – 1 species
Pseudopenicillium  – 3 species
Sclerocleista  – 2 species
Xerochrysium  – 2 species
Xeromyces  – 1 species
Family Elaphomycetaceae 
Elaphomyces  – 101 species
Pseudotulostoma  – 2 species
Family Penicillaginaceae 
Penicillago  – 4 species
Family Thermoascaceae 
Paecilomyces  – 10 species
Thermoascus  – 5 species
Family Trichocomaceae 
Acidotalaromyces  – 1 species
Ascospirella  – 1 species
Dendrosphaera  – 1 species
Evansstolkia  – 1 species
Rasamsonia  – 11 species
Sagenomella  – 8 species
Talaromyces  – 149 species
Thermomyces  – 6 species
Trichocoma  – 2 species

References

 
Ascomycota orders